a.k.a. Unbeatable Banzuke was a weekly Japanese television program and the premier sports entertainment variety show of the Tokyo Broadcasting System (TBS). They were succeeded by Muscle Musical. Several seasonal specials were also made, such as Pro Sportsman No.1 and Sasuke.

Originally a late-night Friday broadcast, the television special was popular and started airing in prime time on October 14, 1995. Through various games reverting to the origins of sports, professional players and general participants challenged the limits of physical strength and technique, winning prizes if all targets were successfully destroyed.

Kane Kosugi's Shaolin Temple training and Akira Oomori's Muay Thai bouts were also documented in the broadcasts.

The use of the program's mascot, originally only featured during the broadcast, expanded in 1996 into the program's opening sequence and every game's introduction. Simultaneously in 1999, a brandmark for the program, different from its logotype, was created: the English initials, "MR". However, as of 2000, only the mascot remained, and the "MR" brandmark vanished, having only appeared for that brief time.

History

Injuries and sudden cancellation
On May 5, 2002, two show participants injured their cervical vertebrae during the filming of an episode entitled "Chikarajima" ("Power Island"), an obstacle course with a temple-like setting stationed outside. The accidents occurred during the "rock attack" and "rock valley" obstacle portions.

In rock attack, contestants try to catch a giant ball that comes down a 15-degree slope, they must then push the ball back up the slope where a platform leads to the rock valley waterway. In rock valley, they try to walk on the ball, which weighs about 30 kg and has a diameter of 1.8 meters, across the aforementioned waterway 2.5 meters wide and 1.4 meters deep. Wei Tao, a 19-year-old Chinese freshman at Kyoto University, fell into the waterway during the rock valley obstacle. Takunori Isa, a 20-year-old junior at Tokai University, was knocked down when he tried to catch the ball in rock attack and was rolled over by the ball. It was later revealed that at least two other contestants suffered spinal injuries while participating on the show as well. College student Takahiro Saito, 19, was hospitalized after falling more than six feet into a four-foot-deep water-filled moat, while another contestant was hospitalized after trying to catch a 100-pound plastic ball, nearly six feet in diameter.

The May 5, 2002 episode would prove to be the final episode of Kinniku Banzuke. Show production was officially put on hiatus, and the show was effectively cancelled. The dormant space was filled with a special edition of Count Down TV, CDTV Gold, entitled . It was revived in 2008, and aired in first-run episodes on G4 and MYX TV in America and Challenge in the UK.

Broadcast time 
Saturday at 19:00 JST (Except for TV Yamaguchi. At first, it was not broadcast on TV Kouchi either but started midway in April 2000. At that time, TV Kouchi had a time slot open on Kouchi Sun Sun TV when a Fuji TV drama was moved to a different slot, and thereafter, the network started broadcasting TV Asahi's programs at a different time. In addition, TV Yamaguchi was once a Fuji Network System affiliate and syndicated some Fuji TV programs.)

Hosts
 Ichirou Furutachi (1995–2002)
 Ryuuta Mine (1995–2002)
 Uno Kanda (first assistant)
 Emiri Nakayama (second assistant)
 Rome Kanda (as Kei Kato) replaced the original hosts for the G4 version (DutyFree TV/TV That's Plugged In)
 Brian Blessed (as 'Banzuke Brian') replaced the original hosts for the Challenge version
 Luis Crespo (as Host) replaced the original hosts for the Canal 300 version
 Maxim Galkin (as Host) replaced the original hosts for the Channel One version

Courses
Courses that are defeated are then recreated in an attempt to be made more difficult and thus "unbeatable". This is why there are different versions (I, II, III, IV, V) next to some names. Sometimes an obstacle is changed between attempts to conquer this game, so there are letters (A, B) next to the versions. This is most likely done because of the injuries caused by this obstacle. Some of these events have "break zones", where any competitor who reaches that point is allowed to take a 30-second break before they must continue on with the course.
 Amazing Road – Competitors must cross a 15-metre-long suspended beam while avoiding six turnstiles fitted with padded bars that can knock them off. This was the Final new event that aired in the US version.
 Athletic Love (El Amor Atlético) – Two people of a couple stand at either end of a bridge-like construct. They have 60 seconds to reach the center without falling off or using their hands. This challenge has had three victories. The third victory aired only in Japan.
 Bamboo Derby (Hongo de Bambú) (On Ultimate Banzuke renamed: "Walking Tall") I, IIA, IIB, III – Obstacle course where competitors walk on stilts. Between IIA and IIB, Snow Mountain was the first mountain obstacle but due to its punishing difficulty, it was replaced by the easier Green Mountain. This challenge has had 2 victories. In the first Bamboo derby, a competitor cleared the event, but due to him skipping a stepping stone, he was disqualified. 
 Banzai 90 – A six-person team has 90 seconds to launch one of their own onto each of four padded logs hanging several feet above the floor. When all four logs are taken, they must hold their position for 10 more seconds. The logs are of varying heights: Red – 11 ft 4 in, yellow – 10 ft 7 in, green – 10 ft 1 in, and blue – 9 ft 1 in. This challenge had 4 victories.
 Daruma 7 – A 'daruma' sits atop a stack of 7 blocks. Competitors use a sledgehammer to knock out each block from the bottom up without letting the 'daruma' (or any other section) fall off. This challenge has had 4 victories, 2 in a modified version below. One of these victories was Yakult Swallows superstar catcher Atsuya Furuta.
 Super Daruma – Modified version of Daruma 7 which has 9 blocks to knock out instead of 7.
 Daruma 7 Ace – Modified version of Daruma 7 which the blocks start out small and get larger. This version of the challenge has 2 victories. The 2nd victory was only aired in Japan.
 Extra Kendama – Competitors play with a life-size kendama. They have 60 seconds to swing the ball onto the large cup, then onto the small cup, and finally onto the central spike without dropping the kendama.
 Giant Ball – Obstacle course where competitors stay atop a 5-foot-wide ball without ever falling off or even straying from the course. If a 5-foot-wide ball gets stuck in pothole, contestants will need to escape within the 10-second limit.
 Hand Walk I, IIa, IIb, IIIA, IIIB, IV – Obstacle course where competitors walk on their hands. This course has a break zone. Between IIIA and IIIB, the Conveyor Belt was changed to Bamboo Bridge. As for IIa and IIb, the Rolling Hills were changed to the Hills and Stairs. This challenge has had 4 victories. The competitor that defeated Hand Walk III was aired only in Japan, but it remains unknown. The fourth version only aired in Japan.
 Kangaroo – Obstacle course where competitors use a pogo stick. This course has a break zone.
 Like a Pierrot I, II, III, IV, V, Ghost – Obstacle course where competitors ride a unicycle. This event has had 8 victories, the most of any challenge.
 Muscle Gym – Two competitors have to do as many sit-ups, back extensions, and push-ups as they can in 3 minutes. This challenge was played four times; by design, there was a victory each time it was played.
 Nakama – Two people run through an obstacle course while tethered together. They have 70 seconds to reach the end.
 Neko de Drive I, II, III – Obstacle course involving a man transporting a woman on a wheelbarrow that looks like a cat (a "neko (cat) cart"). The contestants have 60 seconds to complete the first four obstacles and reach the break zone. After that, the time is unlimited. This is the second course to undergo a numerical upgrade change without a victor. The second and third version only aired in Japan.
 Ottoto 9 – Obstacle course where competitors balance a metal pole on two fingers (hands in US Version). This obstacle is similar to Steady Voyage in Viking, The Ultimate Obstacle Course. Letting your pole fall or touch any metal obstacle results in failure. This course has a break zone. This challenge has had 1 victory.
 Quick Muscle – (On Ultimate Banzuke renamed: "Push Up Showdown") Two competitors have to do as many push-ups as they can in 3 minutes. The one who does more at the end of 3 minutes is declared the champion. Any time a competitor uses improper form, the penalty light goes on, deactivating that competitor's counter for 10 seconds. By design, there is a victory each time the challenge is played; all five wins were achieved by the same competitor. In one of them, a contender bit his lips hard enough to bleed, marking the first time to show blood in that show.
 Seesaw 60 – Two people stand atop a giant seesaw. They have 60 seconds to move a 10 kg barrel from one side to the other without letting either end of the seesaw touch the floor. A third person gets to call out advice to the other two people. This challenge has had 1 victory.
 Skateboarder I, II, – Obstacle course where competitors ride a skateboard. This course has a break zone, where competitors only have to take a short break. This challenge has had 1 victory. Second version was only aired in Japan.
 Spider Walk – Competitors must climb through a 79-meter-long set of parallel walls, using their arms and legs to move forward without touching the ground. This course would later become the inspiration for the "Spider Walk" and "Jumping Spider" obstacles in Sasuke. This challenge has had 2 victories.
 Sponge Bridge I, II, III – Competitors have to walk atop three rows of giant foam blocks, each harder than the last. This was based on the Takeshi's Castle game 'Dominoes', and has also been used as 'Domino Hill' in stage 3 of KUNOICHI. This course is the first to be updated to a new edition and advance numerically without being defeated first. This challenge has had 2 victories. Sponge Bridge III was the final event ever aired in the US Version.
 Super Helico I, II, – Obstacle course involving a radio-controlled helicopter. This course has a break zone to allow the copter's batteries to be replaced. Although the US showed 1 victory, there were multiple victories only aired in Japan. The second version was only aired in Japan.
 Super Rider I, II, III, IV, V – Obstacle course where competitors ride a bicycle (mountain bike trials). This challenge has had 6 victories. Two more courses were made and filmed, but never aired except in Japan (there are clips from the competition in the international versions). Keigo Arizono's Super Rider III victory was the final victory aired in the US Version.
 Strong Mama – A course designed specifically for women. They have 60 seconds to clear the first five obstacles. After that, time is unlimited.
 Trampoline – Competitors must bounce off of trampolines onto stacks of foam blocks. This competition has three stages, and all competitors who complete the first stage are held until all competitors attempt the stage. Afterwards, all successful competitors attempt the second stage in the same manner.
 Untouchable – Four contestants face off, two at a time, 1-on-1 in a caged wrestling competition, with 3 batons each strapped to their bodies, on their back and each leg. The competitors must remove 2 out of 3 batons off of the other to win a match. After a baton is removed, competition ceases temporarily as the baton is placed in a box. The first person to win 2 matches is placed on the Banzuke. This challenge has had 1 victory.

"Struck Out", "Kick Target", etc. – The contest for the 2 million yen prize consisted of many games that formed the "2 Million Yen Dream Plan".

The Banzuke (The List of Champions) (Grouped by Course)

Athletic Love — Atsushi & Michiko Hirata - 49s, Naomi & Tatsuya Gunzi - 59s
Bamboo Derby I — Hiroshi Kobayashi - 1:11
Bamboo Derby II — Hiroshi Takahashi - 1:01
Banzai 90 — Acrobatics Team - 45.79s left, Arm Wrestling Team - 36.53s left, Break Monkeys and Cheerleaders - 20.66s left, Nippon Sports Science University - 11.59s left
Daruma 7 — Atsuya Furuta, Yoichi Fukaya, Yoshimitsu Nishiumi
Daruma 7 Ace -- Kazunori Harayama
Hand Walk I — Aizu Nie - 2:11, Yukio Iketani - 54s
Hand Walk II — Yuki Takahashi - 1:15,
Like a Pierrot I — Fuyuki Tsuchiya - 1:45, Yuichi Ono - 1:18
Like a Pierrot II — Natsuki Hata - 50s, Daiki Izumida - 47s, Yuichiro Kato - 30s
Like a Pierrot III — Yuichiro Kato - 3:03
Like a Pierrot IV — Yoshiaki Handa - 2:41
Like a Pierrot V — Yoshiaki Handa - 2:21
Muscle Gym — Jaguar Yokota - 126, Jimon Terakado - 159, Yasuei Yakushiji - 141, Shigeyuki Nakamura - 124
Neko de Drive III — Toyohisa Ijima & Miho Nishimura, Gori & Rikako Murayama
Ottoto 9 — Tomoteru Fukuda - 4:52
Quick Muscle — Kohei Asano (5 times)
Seesaw 60 — Hiroyasu Matsukawa, Mitsuyoshi Tanaka, & Yuji Iwana Boxing team - 11s left
Skeboarder — Kentaro Tanaka - 2:02
Spider Walk — Shinobu Sekiya - 1:06, Kiyohara Yagi - 1:00
Sponge Bridge — Makoto Tsuji - 31s, Shuichi Shirotori - 19s
Super Helico — Yuji Kamiya - 4:31
Super Rider I — Isamu Hasenaka - 1:30
Super Rider II — Jaromír Spěšný - 4:18
Super Rider III — Keigo Arizono - 4:06
Super Rider IV — Ot Pi Isern - 4:41
Super Rider V — Keigo Arizono
Untouchable — Yasutoshi Kujirai

Courses' obstacles
Amazing Road -
 First Turnstiles
 Second Turnstiles
 Third Turnstiles

Banzai 90 - 4 Sandbags suspended in air
Banzai 90 "2" - 4 Sandbags suspended in air
 Green and Yellow bags on a Seesaw
 Red log swings back and Forth
 Blue log bounces up and down
 Daruma 7 -
 7 blocks
 Super Daruma -
 9 blocks
 Daruma 7 Ace -
 7 blocks smallest at the bottom, getting larger at the top. The final block is the same original size.
 Extra Kendama -
 Large Cup
 Small Cup
 Spike
 Giant Ball -
 Downward Slope
 Pothole Zone
 Sloping Right Turn
 Uphill Slope
 Final Bridge

 Kangaroo -
 The Steps
 Zig-Zag Path
 Mushrooms
 Bushes
 Narrow Bridge
BREAK ZONE
 Checkerboard
 Falling Stones
 Neon Grid
 Broken Bridge
 Muscle Gym
 Sit-Ups
 Back Lifts
 Push-Ups
 Neko De Drive
 Banana Turn
 Watermelon Ramp
 Donut Loop
 Mouse Trap
BREAK ZONE
 Book Steps
 Broken Piano
 Slanted Path
 Zig-Zag Wall
 Fish Ribs
 Nakama
 Twin Balance Bridge
 Bob & Weave
 Wiggle Bridge
 Rolling Poles
 Triple Step
 Curved Mountain
 Curved Valley
 Curved Jump
 Monkey Bars
 Ottoto 9
 Right Hand Curve
 The Stairs
 Crossbars
 Cross Hammers
 Narrowing Stairs
 Narrow Bridge
BREAK ZONE
 Propeller
 Five Valleys
 S-Curve

 Strong Mama
 Sliding Bag
 Mattress Beater
 Cart Dash
 Narrow Bridge
 Bike Express
BREAK ZONE
 Rolling Panic
 Air Walk
 Big Wheel
 Wedding Cake
 Super Helico
 Slalom
 Tower
 Debris Tunnels
 Cage
 Cave
BREAK ZONE
 Fans
 Crazy Eight
 Slider
 Landing Pad
 Spider Walk
 Straightaway
 Widening Corridor
 90-Curve
 Ascending Corridor
 Descending Corridor
 Crossbar
 S-Curve
 Skeboarder
 Ollie Step
 Rampage
 Tube
 Handrail
BREAK ZONE
 Narrow Slopes
 Stairs
 Double Halfpipe
 Big Canyon
 Jump Ramp
 Sponge Bridge
 Green Zone
 Yellow Zone
 Red Zone
 Sponge Bridge 2
 Green Zone
 Yellow Zone
 Red Zone
 Sponge Bridge 3
 Green Zone
 Yellow Zone
 Red Zone

Broadcast

United States
This show can be seen on America's G4 network, under the name Unbeatable Banzuke with Rome Kanda from I Survived a Japanese Game Show (aka Kei Kato) as the host. It airs in half-hour episodes, two or three games per episode, in its original Japanese language and partial original broadcast also with English subtitles. The player profiles, rules, and replays, however, are narrated by voice actor Dave Wittenberg, who also narrates Ninja Warrior. Upon the network's relaunch, the preview segment before the opening sequence has been removed.

Canada
Same as the American version. It is presented on the Canadian version of G4 called G4 Canada.

Czech Republic
Under the title "Bezkonkurenční Banzuke". Just like in Hungary, the show commenced broadcast in Czech Republic on November 27, 2010, until 2013 on Animax, but the show was completely dubbed to Czech.

Australia
The Australian version is presented on SBS Two. It is currently broadcast every weekday at 6 p.m., and has been since the relaunch of SBS2. Previously, it was not shown very often but was still broadcast every now and again.

Ukraine
In Ukraine Kinniku Banzuke is named "Базука" (pronounced as "Bazooka") and broadcast by the Mega channel.

United Kingdom
Under the title Unbeatable Banzuke, the show commenced transmission in the UK on October 6, 2008, on Challenge. It is similar to the US broadcast in length, language and partial original broadcast, but unlike the American version has no subtitles. Brian Blessed is the host and voice-over as costumed character Banzuke Brian (who is meant to be the creator of the challenges) over the whole show, including replays, profiles and course attempts. The show also reran on Channel One until its closure in 2011.

Finland
In Finland the show is called Banzuke and it is broadcast on Jim. The show airs on Friday and Saturday nights at 11 pm with two episodes sequentially. The version is same as the American, but with Finnish subtitles.

Hungary
Under the title Verhetetlen Banzuke, the show commenced broadcast in Hungary on November 27, 2010, on Animax. The show is completely dubbed to Hungarian.

Estonia
In Estonia the show is called Lyömättömään Banzuke and it is broadcast on TV3. The show airs on Weeknights at 9 pm with two episodes sequentially. The version is the same as the other international versions, but with Estonian.

Lithuania
In Lithuania the show is called Nenugalimas Banzukė and it is broadcast on TV6. The show airs weekdays at 2 pm with two episodes sequentially. The version is the same as the other international versions, but with Lithuanian.

Sweden
In Sweden the show is called Oslagbar Banzuke and it is broadcast on TV4. The show airs on weekdays at 1 pm with two episodes sequentially. The version is the same as the other international versions, but with Swedish.

France
In France the show is called Imbattable Banzuke and it is broadcast on TF1. The show airs on weekdays at 9 am with two episodes sequentially. The version is the same as the Australian version, but with French.

Spain
In Spain the show is called Unbeatable Banzuke and is broadcast by La Siete (owned by Telecinco). The host is the same as in the USA version. The show is completely dubbed into Spanish.

South Africa
Broadcast as Unbeatable Banzuke on Animax (as of 2010 at least). Since broadcast on Sony Max under the same name.

Portugal
In Portugal the show is called Todos ao Molho and it was first broadcast on SIC K and later on SIC Radical. The version is the same as the other international versions, but with Portuguese commentary.

Bosnia and Herzegovina
In Bosnia and Herzegovina Kinniku Banzuke is named Nepobjedive banzuke and broadcast on Program plus (Alternativna TV and Hayat TV).

Germany
In Germany the show is called Unschlagbare Banzuke and it is broadcast on RTL II. The show airs on Weeknights at 7 pm with two episodes sequentially. The version is the same as the other international versions, but with German.

Italy
In Italy the show can be seen on GXT. The show airs weekdays at 5 pm with two episodes sequentially. The version is the same as the other international versions, but with Italian.

Netherlands
In the Netherlands the show is called Onklopbare Banzuke and it is broadcast on RTL 4. The show airs weekdays at 12:30 pm with three episodes sequentially. The version is the same as the other international versions, but with Dutch.

Serbia
Broadcast by B92 after the end of Ninja Warrior. Voiced-over by voicers from Ninja Warrior.

Russia
In Russia the show is called Непобедимый Банзуке and it is broadcast on Channel One with host Maxim Galkin. The show airs on Weeknights at 10 pm with two episodes sequentially. The version is the same as the other international versions, but with Russian.

Croatia
In Croatia the show is called Nepobjediv Banzuke and it is broadcast on RTL Televizija. The show airs on weekdays at 12 pm with two episodes sequentially. The version is the same as the other international versions, but with Croatian.

India
In India Kinniku Banzuke is named Unbeatable Banzuke and broadcast on Pogo TV.

Venezuela
In Venezuela the show is called Inmejorable Banzuke and it is broadcast on Venevisión. The show airs Friday and Saturday nights at 7 pm with two episodes sequentially. The version is same as the American, but with Spanish subtitles.

Malaysia
In Malaysia, Kinniku Banzuke is named Unbeatable Banzuke and broadcast on TV3, starting 5 June 2011 every Sunday.

Episodes G4

* If the letters are gold, that means the challenge was defeated.

Spinoffs
In the UK, Channel 5 made their own version of this show called Under Pressure. It featured many similar events, namely Hand Walk, Super Rider, Neko de Drive and Sponge Bridge.
Games like Kick Target were separate segments normally attempted by athletes at various training facilities.
For pictures of this version, check: UKgameshows

In Germany, Sat.1 made their own version of the show called Champions Day. It was similar in style to Under Pressure and again featured many similar events. It lasted four episodes.
For pictures of this version, check: Here

Worldwide
Unbeatable Banzuke is also broadcast in other countries around the world:

See also
Kunoichi (Women's version of Sasuke)
Sasuke (Known in America as Ninja Warrior)
Viking: The Ultimate Obstacle Course

Notes

External links
SASUKE - Unbeatable Banzuke Fansite with challenge info, episode guide and videos

1990s Japanese television series
2000s Japanese television series
1995 Japanese television series debuts
2002 Japanese television series endings
TBS Television (Japan) original programming
G4 (American TV network) original programming
Japanese game shows
Obstacle racing television game shows